John Stuchell Fisher (May 25, 1867June 25, 1940) was an American politician who served as the 29th governor of Pennsylvania from 1927 until 1931. A Republican, he had previously served as a Pennsylvania State Senator from 1901 until 1907.

Life and career
Fisher was born in South Mahoning Township, Pennsylvania, in 1867. Fisher graduated from Pennsylvania's Indiana State Normal School (now Indiana University of Pennsylvania) and began his career as a teacher; he then served as principal for schools in Plumville and Indiana, Pennsylvania.

In 1893, Fisher finished his law degree, was admitted into the Pennsylvania Bar, and set up a private practice. He won his first major office, to the Pennsylvania State Senate, in 1900. He was re-elected in 1904 but did not seek re-election in 1908. He later served on the state's Commission on Constitutional Revision. From 1919 to 1922 he served in the cabinet of Governor William Cameron Sproul as State Commissioner of Banking. He was elected Governor in 1926.

As governor, Fisher focused on fiscal policy, public works, and conservation. Partly due to his efforts to eliminate voting fraud, the state began using mechanical voting machines. The Department of Revenue was established during his term. Fisher's term was marked by major investments in public works, most notably the Soldiers and Sailors Memorial Bridge in Harrisburg. According to Major Israel McCreight, "Without his vigorous strokes for justice and fair play there would not now be the Cook Forest State Park."

After leaving office, Fisher became a consultant to his son's law firm. He also served on the boards of several financial establishments, Indiana Hospital, Indiana State Normal School, and Pennsylvania State College. He died in Pittsburgh in 1940.

Sources

National Governors Association
Pennsylvania Historical and Museum Commission
ExplorePAHistory.com
William Ainsworth Cornell, The Political Career of John S. Fisher, Governor of Pennsylvania 1927-1931 (Indiana, Pennsylvania: MA thesis: State Teachers College, 1947).

Republican Party governors of Pennsylvania
1867 births
1940 deaths
Republican Party Pennsylvania state senators
Indiana University of Pennsylvania alumni